The Picasso Summer is a 1969 drama directed by Serge Bourguignon and Robert Sallin, starring Albert Finney and Yvette Mimieux. The screenplay was written by Ray Bradbury (using the pseudonym of Douglas Spaulding) based upon his 1957 short story, "In a Season of Calm Weather."

Future Academy Award winner Vilmos Zsigmond was the cinematographer. There were two directors. Serge Bourguignon was the original director whose rough cut was rejected by Warner Brothers. Another director, Robert Sallin, was hired to reshoot some scenes and to do the changed ending. Even with the reworked scenes, the movie was never released to theaters in the United States. It was sold for distribution to TV networks and stations with Sallin receiving the director's credit.

Plot summary

George Smith (Albert Finney) is a bored, young San Francisco architect, at loose ends and feeling a bit depressed after finishing a project in which he felt his contribution was of little consequence. After he and his wife Alice (Yvette Mimieux) attend a vacuous party, they go home and George reassesses his life. George thinks about how much he admires Pablo Picasso, the great artist, who pursues his dreams with abandon. He suddenly feels an overwhelming urge to meet the artist and proposes to his wife that they fly to France that very evening in search of him. They arrive in the south of France and after a day or two of searching, arrive at the gate of his villa, only to be told that Picasso sees no one.

After a dismal dinner at a local restaurant, George goes off to a bar, while Alice returns to the hotel. The next morning, she is awakened by a drunken George, who returns with an equally drunken Frenchman whom he has befriended. By this time, George's obsessive quest has begun to wear thin.  She refuses to accompany him to Spain in pursuit of a famous matador who, he has been told, is a friend of Picasso's and may be persuaded to furnish an introduction to Picasso. George goes off by himself and has an adventure in Spain with the matador, while Alice wanders about the French town alone. She meets a blind painter and his wife, who invite her home for supper and give her one of his paintings.

George returns, thoroughly disappointed and disgusted that his great quest has come to nothing. He apologizes to Alice for taking her on such a miserable vacation. They go for one last swim at the beach before walking off into the sunset, failing to notice Picasso, at the same beach with his family, standing a few hundred yards away, drawing fantastic figures in the sand.

Cast
 Albert Finney as George Smith
 Yvette Mimieux as Alice Smith
 Luis Miguel Dominguín as himself (the bullfighter)
 Theo Marcuse as The Host
 Jim Connell as The Artist
Sopwith Camel as The Band at the Party
Peter Madden as Blind Man
Tutte Lemkow as Drunk
Graham Stark as Postman
Marty Ingels as man at Party
 Bee Duffell as German Tourist

Music
The score was composed by Michel Legrand, and features the theme "Summer Me, Winter Me". It appears in its instrumental form in the soundtrack album (coupled with Legrand's music for Summer of '42). However in its vocal setting, with words by Alan and Marilyn Bergman, it has been recorded by many artists, including Barbra Streisand, Sarah Vaughan, Frank Sinatra, Johnny Mathis, Kiri Te Kanawa and Morgana King.

See also
 List of American films of 1969

References

External links 
 
 
 

1969 films
1969 drama films
Pablo Picasso
American drama films
Films scored by Michel Legrand
Films based on works by Ray Bradbury
1960s English-language films
Films directed by Serge Bourguignon
1960s American films